Wheaton may refer to:

Places
United States
 Wheaton, Illinois, a city
 Wheaton station (Union Pacific), a railroad station
 Wheaton, Kansas, a city
 Wheaton, Maryland, a census-designated place
 Wheaton station (Washington Metro), a Washington Metro rapid transit station
 Wheaton, Minnesota, a city
 Wheaton Township, Barry County, Missouri
 Wheaton, Missouri, a city in the township
 Wheaton, Wisconsin, a town

Canada
 Wheaton Lake, British Columbia

United Kingdom
 Wheaton Aston, a village in Staffordshire

Businesses
 Wheaton Industries, manufacturer of glass and ceramic products in southern New Jersey
 Wheaton Science Products, a subsidiary of Alcan based in Millville, New Jersey, related to Wheaton Industries
 Wheaton World Wide Moving, international moving and storage company in Indiana

Schools
 Wheaton Academy, West Chicago, Illinois
 Wheaton College (Illinois)
 Wheaton College (Massachusetts)
 Wheaton High School, Montgomery County, Maryland

People
 Wheaton (surname)
 Wheaton Chambers (1887-1958), American film and television actor

Other uses
Wheaton v. Peters, the first United States Supreme Court case on copyright law
Wheatons, a unit of Twitter followers

See also
 Wheaton Aston, Staffordshire, England